Askrigg railway station is a disused railway station in North Yorkshire, England and served the village of Askrigg. It was part of the Wensleydale Railway until it closed. The Wensleydale Railway Association aims to rebuild the railway from Northallerton to Garsdale, with an eventual aim of reopening the intermediate stations.

History
The station was opened by the North Eastern Railway on 1 February 1877. The line became part of the London and North Eastern Railway during the Grouping of 1923.

The station was host to a camping coach from 1936 to 1939 and could possibly have had a coach in 1933 and/or 1934.

The line then passed on to the Eastern Region of British Railways on nationalisation in 1948.  It was subsequently closed by the British Transport Commission on 26 April 1954, although goods traffic continued until the Redmire to Hawes section closed to all traffic in 1964.

The site today
The track has been lifted through the station site. The nearest track on the line runs from Redmire eastward, providing rail access for military traffic to local training areas.  The Wensleydale Railway is a heritage line which operates from Redmire to

References

Bibliography

Further reading

External links
 Station on navigable O.S. map

Disused railway stations in North Yorkshire
Railway stations in Great Britain opened in 1877
Railway stations in Great Britain closed in 1954
Wensleydale
Former North Eastern Railway (UK) stations